Martin Scherer (* born 27 July 1972 in Marburg) is a German university professor and specialist for general practice and primary care. He is director of the Department of General practice and Primary care and head of the Division of Primary Medical Care at the University Medical Center Hamburg-Eppendorf. Since 2015 he is vice president of the German College of General Practitioners and Family Physicians (DEGAM) and since 2006 speaker of the Clinical Guidelines Committee.

Biography
From 1993 until 1999 Scherer studied medicine in Marburg, Vienna and Paris. After he had finished his specialist training in general medicine in 2004, Scherer was research assistant in the division of general medicine of the University hospital Göttingen, from 2006 on as senior physician. In 2009 Scherer was appointed for the professorship health care research and became Deputy Director of the Institute for Social Medicine of the University of Lübeck. Also in 2009 Scherer was founding member and Deputy Speaker of the academical Center for population medicine and health care research. Since 2012 Scherer has been director of the department of Primary Medical Care and head of the division of general medicine at the University Medical Center Hamburg-Eppendorff.  Furthermore, he is editor of the Hamburger Ärzteblatt.

Scientific contribution
One of Scherer's scientific focus is to further develop methods in health care research. Goal is to develop indicators which can be used to measure quality in health care provision. Furthermore, Scherer is working on systematic surveys and meta-analyses. Through randomized controlled trials high levels of medical evidence are developed to trace the effectiveness of medical and diagnostic measures. As a speaker of DEGAM, Scherer is dealing with the development of guidelines. Another focus of Scherer is multimorbidity. Scherer is Co-Principal Investigator in several studies. In the MultiCare Claims Study, which is supported by the Federal Ministry of Education and Research (Germany), Scherer and Hendrik van den Bussche are investigating whether single illnesses and their interaction are relevant in terms of multimorbidity or whether it is rather the subjective consequences for patients. Together with Wolfgang Maier and Steffi Riedel-Heller, he is carrying out the AgeCoDe-Study about dementia. Scherer is Principal Investigator of the RECODE-study on heart failure. Furthermore, he is working on a guideline which aims to contribute to avoidance of over-, under provision in health care.

Memberships in scientific organisations
Scherer is member of various scientific organizations.  
 Member of the Guideline Commission of the Association of the Scientific Medical Societies in Germany (AWMF)
 Member of the scientific advisory board of the AQUA- Institute on Applied Quality Improvement and Research in Healthcare
 Member of the scientific advisory board of the Journal for Evidence and Quality in Health Care (ZEFQ)
 Executive Board, European Cardiovascular Society (EPCCS)
 European council on cardiovascular primary care, European Society of Cardiology (ESC)
 Member of the scientific advisory board of the Versorgungsatlas of the Central Research Institute of Ambulatory Health Care

Publications
 List of publications, PubMed
 List of publications, homepage University Lübeck

References

External links 
 Profile of Martin Scherer, Primary Health Care - Research & Information Service (PHCRIS)
 SOCIAL ENTREPRENEURS: TAKING ON WORLD PROBLEMS - In Germany, Asylum Seekers' Medical Needs Are Being Contained, npr.org, June 13, 2016
 Elsevier: The most cited articles published since 2011, Zeitschrift fur Evidenz, Fortbildung und Qualitat im Gesundheitswesen, extracted from Scopus

1972 births
People from Marburg
German medical researchers
German general practitioners
Living people
Academic staff of the University of Hamburg